The Pacific sheath-tailed bat or Polynesian sheath-tailed bat (Emballonura semicaudata) is a species of sac-winged bat in the family Emballonuridae found in American Samoa, Fiji, Guam, Micronesia, Palau, Samoa (where it is called pe'a vai, tagiti or pe'ape'a vai), Tonga, and Vanuatu. Its natural habitat is caves. 

In 2013, Bat Conservation International listed this species as one of the 35 species on its worldwide priority list for conservation. It is threatened by habitat loss. There are estimated to be approximately 500 individuals of the subspecies E. s. rotensis.  Currently known to roost in only three caves, E. s. rotensis is vulnerable to changes in the local habitat, including indirect impacts caused by invasive species such as goats which limit its carrying capacity.

References

Emballonura
Bats of Oceania
Fauna of Micronesia
Mammals of American Samoa
Mammals of Fiji
Fauna of Guam
Fauna of Palau
Mammals of Samoa
Mammals of Tonga
Mammals of Vanuatu
Mammals described in 1848
Endangered fauna of Oceania
Taxonomy articles created by Polbot
ESA endangered species
Taxa named by Titian Peale